Windsor Park station is a station on the South Chicago Branch of the Metra Electric District Line.

Part of 75th Street-Windsor Park station's name is also shared with another 75th Street Metra Electric station at Grand Crossing on the main branch. Parking is available along northbound Exchange Avenue between 75th Place and 75th Street and along both sides of Saginaw Avenue, south of southbound Exchange Avenue. The station was recently renovated in 2008.

Bus connections
CTA
  N5 South Shore Night Bus 
  71 71st/South Shore 
  75 74th/75th

References

External links

75th Street entrance from Google Maps Street View

Windsor Park